The Paignton Picture House is a currently disused cinema in Paignton, England, situated on Torbay Road.

It was opened on 16 March 1914, and is believed to be the oldest surviving purpose-built cinema in Europe. In its early days it featured a 21-piece orchestra, with each member paid a guinea to perform. There are 375 seats: 271 in the stalls, 104 in the circle, plus three private boxes at the back seating an additional eight.

Closure 
The cinema closed down on 26 September 1999 following the opening of a multiplex cinema at the other end of the same road. It was bought by the Paignton & Dartmouth Steam Railway, which is adjacent, who had plans to turn it into a passenger waiting area. However, due to the building's Grade II listed building status, it is difficult to make any extensive changes and those plans were shelved.

More recently, there has been talk of returning the Paignton Picture House to its former glory, as a living film museum featuring films from the very first days of silent cinema through to the 1950s. The experience would be further enhanced by staff wearing period costume.  However, discussions with the railway company have some way to go before the future of this historic building is known.

Restoration
The cinema was bought from the Paignton & Dartmouth Steam Railway by The Paignton Picture House Trust with a grant of £40,000 from Historic England and funding from Torbay Council. A further £49,000 was obtained from the Coastal Revival Fund to make the building safe and open the building for tours.

The Paignton Picture House Trust has been awarded a grant by Historic England of £206,680 towards the restoration, covering the full cost of essential repairs to the intricate stone work and unique stained glass windows. In December 2021, the first stage of the restoration project was completed, with the exterior of the building cleaned and repaired.

The trust received in March 2022 £3m from the Department for Digital, Culture, Media and Sport to continue restoration for an opening in 2025 after a planning application is submitted summer 2022 and work starting in 2023.

Miscellanea

Seat 2, Row 2 of the circle was the favourite seat of Torquay-born crime novelist Agatha Christie, who lived at Greenway House, near neighbouring Kingswear. The cinemas and theatres in her books are all reportedly based on the Paignton Picture House. 
The last film shown before closure was the deliberately ironic The Smallest Show on Earth.
While the nearby Methodist church was being renovated, the local minister used the Paignton Picture House for services.

Gallery

References

External links
Paignton Picture House Trust 
Inside the world's oldest cinema - the Paignton Picture House Devon Live, 30 May 2020.
Derelict Paignton Picture House is a cinema frozen in time Devon Live, 28 September 2021

Former cinemas in England
Buildings and structures in Paignton
Grade II listed buildings in Devon